Dontavius Russell (born September 18, 1995) is an American football defensive tackle who is a free agent. He played college football at Auburn and was drafted by the Jaguars in the seventh round of the 2019 NFL Draft.

Professional career
Russell was drafted by the Jacksonville Jaguars in the seventh round with the 235th overall pick in the 2019 NFL Draft.

On August 9, 2020, Russell was placed on injured reserve with a hip injury. He was waived on March 17, 2021.

References

External links
Auburn Tigers bio

1995 births
Living people
People from Carrollton, Georgia
Sportspeople from the Atlanta metropolitan area
Players of American football from Georgia (U.S. state)
American football defensive tackles
Auburn Tigers football players
Jacksonville Jaguars players